Doubling for Romeo is a 1921 American silent comedy film directed by Clarence G. Badger and written by Bernard McConville, Elmer Rice, and Will Rogers. The film stars Will Rogers, Sylvia Breamer, Raymond Hatton, Sidney Ainsworth, Al Hart and John Cossar. The film was released on October 23, 1921, by Goldwyn Pictures.

Cast       
Will Rogers as Sam Cody / Romeo
Sylvia Breamer as Lulu / Juliet
Raymond Hatton as Steve Woods / Paris
Sidney Ainsworth as Pendleton / Mercutio
Al Hart as Big Alec / Tybalt
John Cossar as Foster / Capulet
Charles Thurston as Duffy Saunders / Benvolio 
Cordelia Callahan as Maggie / Maid
Roland Rushton as Minister / Friar
Jimmy Rogers as Jimmie Jones
William Orlamond as Movie Director

References

External links

1920s English-language films
Silent American comedy films
1921 comedy films
Goldwyn Pictures films
Films directed by Clarence G. Badger
American silent feature films
American black-and-white films
1920s American films